The 2006–07 was Perth Glory's second season in the Hyundai A-League and the club's 10th season since its inception in 1996.

Players

First team squad

Transfers

In

Out

Pre-season and friendlies

Competitions

Overview

A-League Pre-Season Challenge Cup

Group stage

Finals

A-League

League table

Results summary

Matches

Squad statistics

Appearances

|}

Goalscorers

References

Perth Glory FC seasons
Perth Glory Season, 2006-07